In mathematics, the error function (also called the Gauss error function), often denoted by , is a complex function of a complex variable defined as:

This integral is a special (non-elementary) sigmoid function that occurs often in probability, statistics, and partial differential equations. In many of these applications, the function argument is a real number. If the function argument is real, then the function value is also real.

Two closely related functions are the complementary error function defined as

and the imaginary error function defined as

where  is the imaginary unit.

Name
The name "error function" and its abbreviation  were proposed by J. W. L. Glaisher in 1871 on account of its connection with "the theory of Probability, and notably the theory of Errors." The error function complement was also discussed by Glaisher in a separate publication in the same year.
For the "law of facility" of errors whose density is given by

Applications
This is useful, for example, in determining the bit error rate of a digital communication system.

The error and complementary error functions occur, for example, in solutions of the heat equation when boundary conditions are given by the Heaviside step function.

The error function and its approximations can be used to estimate results that hold with high probability or with low probability. Given a random variable  (a normal distribution with mean  and standard deviation ) and a constant :

If  is sufficiently far from the mean, specifically , then:

The probability for  being in the interval  can be derived as

Properties

The property  means that the error function is an odd function. This directly results from the fact that the integrand  is an even function (the antiderivative of an even function which is zero at the origin is an odd function and vice versa).

Since the error function is an entire function which takes real numbers to real numbers, for any complex number :

where  is the complex conjugate of z.

Taylor series
The error function is an entire function; it has no singularities (except that at infinity) and its Taylor expansion always converges, but is famously known "[...] for its bad convergence if ."

The defining integral cannot be evaluated in closed form in terms of elementary functions, but by expanding the integrand  into its Maclaurin series and integrating term by term, one obtains the error function's Maclaurin series as:

which holds for every complex number . The denominator terms are sequence A007680 in the OEIS.

For iterative calculation of the above series, the following alternative formulation may be useful:

because  expresses the multiplier to turn the th term into the th term (considering  as the first term).

The imaginary error function has a very similar Maclaurin series, which is:

which holds for every complex number .

Derivative and integral
The derivative of the error function follows immediately from its definition:

From this, the derivative of the imaginary error function is also immediate:

An antiderivative of the error function, obtainable by integration by parts, is

An antiderivative of the imaginary error function, also obtainable by integration by parts, is

Higher order derivatives are given by

where  are the physicists' Hermite polynomials.

Bürmann series

 

where  is the sign function.

Inverse functions

Given a complex number , there is not a unique complex number  satisfying , so a true inverse function would be multivalued.

The inverse error function is usually defined with domain , and it is restricted to this domain in many computer algebra systems.  However, it can be extended to the disk  of the complex plane, using the Maclaurin series

where  and

So we have the series expansion (common factors have been canceled from numerators and denominators):

(After cancellation the numerator/denominator fractions are entries / in the OEIS; without cancellation the numerator terms are given in entry .) The error function's value at  is equal to .

For , we have .

The inverse complementary error function is defined as

For real , there is a unique real number  satisfying .

where  is defined as above.

Asymptotic expansion
A useful asymptotic expansion of the complementary error function (and therefore also of the error function) for large real  is

This series diverges for every finite , and its meaning as asymptotic expansion is that for any integer  one has

where the remainder, in Landau notation, is

Indeed, the exact value of the remainder is

which follows easily by induction, writing

and integrating by parts.

Continued fraction expansion
A continued fraction expansion of the complementary error function is:

Integral of error function with Gaussian density function

which appears related to Ng and Geller, formula 13 in section 4.3 with a change of variables.

Factorial series
The inverse factorial series:

Here

 denotes the rising factorial, and  denotes a signed Stirling number of the first kind.
There also exists a representation by an infinite sum containing the double factorial:

Numerical approximations

Approximation with elementary functions
 Abramowitz and Stegun give several approximations of varying accuracy (equations 7.1.25–28). This allows one to choose the fastest approximation suitable for a given application. In order of increasing accuracy, they are:

()

()

()

()

To use these approximations for negative , use the fact that  is an odd function, so .

 Exponential bounds and a pure exponential approximation for the complementary error function are given by

The coefficients  for many variations of the exponential approximations and bounds up to  have been released to open access as a comprehensive dataset.

They determined , which gave a good approximation for all . Alternative coefficients are also available for tailoring accuracy for a specific application or transforming the expression into a tight bound.

 A single-term lower bound is

where the parameter  can be picked to minimize error on the desired interval of approximation.

Another approximation is given by Sergei Winitzki using his "global Padé approximations":

where

This is designed to be very accurate in a neighborhood of 0 and a neighborhood of infinity, and the relative error is less than 0.00035 for all real . Using the alternate value  reduces the maximum relative error to about 0.00013.

This approximation can be inverted to obtain an approximation for the inverse error function:

with

and

Table of values

Related functions

Complementary error function
The complementary error function, denoted , is defined as

This form is advantageous in that the range of integration is fixed and finite.

Imaginary error function
The imaginary error function, denoted , is defined as

Despite the name "imaginary error function",  is real when  is real.

When the error function is evaluated for arbitrary complex arguments , the resulting complex error function is usually discussed in scaled form as the Faddeeva function:

Cumulative distribution function
The error function is essentially identical to the standard normal cumulative distribution function, denoted , also named  by some software languages, as they differ only by scaling and translation. Indeed,

 

Consequently, the error function is also closely related to the Q-function, which is the tail probability of the standard normal distribution. The Q-function can be expressed in terms of the error function as

The standard normal cdf is used more often in probability and statistics, and the error function is used more often in other branches of mathematics.

The error function is a special case of the Mittag-Leffler function, and can also be expressed as a confluent hypergeometric function (Kummer's function):

It has a simple expression in terms of the Fresnel integral.

In terms of the regularized gamma function  and the incomplete gamma function,

 is the sign function.

Generalized error functions

Some authors discuss the more general functions:

Notable cases are:

 is a straight line through the origin: 
 is the error function, .

All generalised error functions for  look similar on the positive  side of the graph.

These generalised functions can equivalently be expressed for  using the gamma function and incomplete gamma function:

Therefore, we can define the error function in terms of the incomplete gamma function:

Iterated integrals of the complementary error function
The iterated integrals of the complementary error function are defined by

The general recurrence formula is

They have the power series

from which follow the symmetry properties

and

Implementations

As real function of a real argument

 In Posix-compliant operating systems, the header math.h shall declare and the mathematical library libm shall provide the functions erf and erfc (double precision) as well as their single precision and extended precision counterparts erff, erfl and erfcf, erfcl.
 The GNU Scientific Library provides erf, erfc, log(erf), and scaled error functions.

As complex function of a complex argument

 libcerf, numeric C library for complex error functions, provides the complex functions cerf, cerfc, cerfcx and the real functions erfi, erfcx with approximately 13–14 digits precision, based on the Faddeeva function as implemented in the MIT Faddeeva Package

See also

Related functions 
 Gaussian integral, over the whole real line
 Gaussian function, derivative
 Dawson function, renormalized imaginary error function
 Goodwin–Staton integral

In probability
 Normal distribution
 Normal cumulative distribution function, a scaled and shifted form of error function
 Probit, the inverse or quantile function of the normal CDF
 Q-function, the tail probability of the normal distribution
 Standard score

References

Further reading

External links
  A Table of Integrals of the Error Functions

Special hypergeometric functions
Gaussian function
Functions related to probability distributions
Analytic functions